Kenora Airport  is located  east northeast of Kenora, Ontario, Canada. The airport is classified as an airport of entry by Nav Canada and is staffed by the Canada Border Services Agency (CBSA) on a call-out basis from the Fort Frances-International Falls International Bridge. CBSA officers at this airport  can handle general aviation aircraft with no more than 15 passengers. The airport is under Aircraft Group Number (AGN) classification of IV.

The airport was one of three finalists for the WestJet Innovation & Excellence Award for the Canadian Tourism Awards 2018, along with Vancouver International Airport and Quebec City Airport.

Airlines and destinations

See also
 Kenora Water Aerodrome

References

External links 

 Kenora Airport

Transport in Kenora
Certified airports in Kenora District